CMRF35-like molecule 6 (CLM-6) also known as CD300 antigen-like family member C (CD300c) is a protein that in humans is encoded by the CD300C gene.

The CMRF35 antigen, which was identified by reactivity with a monoclonal antibody, is present on monocytes, neutrophils, and some T and B lymphocytes.

References

External links

Further reading